Alliance of Light may refer to:
 Alliance of Light, the third story arc in the Wars of Light and Shadow by Janny Wurts 
 The Alliance of Light, a Games Workshop online campaign faction for The Lord of the Rings Strategy Battle Game